Me vs Me may refer to:

Me vs. Me, a 2016 EP by Ella Chen
 "me vs. me", by busdriver off the 2018 album Electricity Is on Our Side 
"Me Vs Me", a 2020 single by Moneybagg Yo
Me vs. Me (mixtape), a 2022 mixtape by NLE Choppa